Paul Francis Stankowski (born December 2, 1969) is an American professional golfer who currently plays on the PGA Tour Champions. He previously played on the Korn Ferry Tour, where he won one event, and the PGA Tour, where he was a two-time champion.

Stankowski was born in Oxnard, California. He first played golf on Easter Sunday in 1978 at the age of 8. He attended the University of Texas at El Paso and turned pro in 1991.

Stankowski initially played on the Nationwide Tour. His first and only victory in this venue came at the 1996 Nike Louisiana Open. The following week, he played in the BellSouth Classic on the PGA Tour and won, becoming the only golfer in history to win a Nationwide Tour event and a PGA Tour event back-to-back. Stankowski started the week as the sixth alternate. He had another big year in 1997, winning the United Airlines Hawaiian Open. His best finish in a major was T5 at the 1997 Masters Tournament.

In 1998, however, his fortunes began to change due to a host of injury-related ailments. He injured his right shoulder at the Bay Hill Invitational that year and also had LASIK surgery. As a Callaway sponsored player in 1999, he tried to help his game by sneaking Ping clubs into his bag at the Colonial. In 2004, he suffered a major injury to his left wrist and played the two following years under a Major Medical Extension.

Stankowski is active in the Fellowship of Christian Athletes (FCA) and sponsored the annual Paul Stankowski FCA Golf Scramble in El Paso for a time. He lives in Flower Mound, Texas in the Dallas-Fort Worth metroplex. 

Stankowski made over 400 starts on the PGA Tour. Towards the end of his PGA Tour career, his desire to be closer to his family resulted in him focusing entrepreneurship and radio broadcasting. He is the co-owner of Francis Edward, a leather goods company whose name is derived from the middle names of Stankowski and co-founder Mike Vicary. 

In 2018 and 2019, he took advantage of an exemption reserved for those 48 and 49 years old on the Korn Ferry Tour, playing in a total of six events but not making the cut in any of them.

In December 2021, Stankowski finished high enough at the PGA Tour Champions Qualifying School (Q-School) to earn eligibility to compete in open qualifiers for PGA Tour Champions events in 2022.

Stankowski is married and has two children.

Professional wins (7)

PGA Tour wins (2)

PGA Tour playoff record (2–0)

Japan Golf Tour wins (1)

Japan Golf Tour playoff record (1–0)

Nike Tour wins (1)

Other wins (3)
1992 New Mexico Open
1996 Lincoln-Mercury Kapalua International
2001 Straight Down Fall Classic (with Brad Payne)

Results in major championships

CUT = missed the half-way cut
"T" = tied

Results in The Players Championship

CUT = missed the halfway cut
WD = withdrew
"T" indicates a tie for a place

Results in senior major championships

CUT = missed the halfway cut
"T" indicates a tie for a place

See also
1993 PGA Tour Qualifying School graduates
1995 PGA Tour Qualifying School graduates
2006 PGA Tour Qualifying School graduates
2010 PGA Tour Qualifying School graduates

References

External links

American male golfers
UTEP Miners men's golfers
PGA Tour golfers
Golfers from California
Golfers from Texas
Sportspeople from Oxnard, California
Sportspeople from Ventura County, California
People from Flower Mound, Texas
1969 births
Living people